The women's 1500 metres in short track speed skating at the 2014 Winter Olympics was held on 15 February 2014 at the Iceberg Skating Palace in Sochi, Russia.

The qualifying heats, semifinal and the final were held on 15 February.

The defending Olympic Champion is Zhou Yang of China, while the defending World Champion is Park Seung-hi of South Korea.

Qualification
Countries were assigned quotas using a combination of the four special Olympic Qualification classifications that were held at two world cups in November 2013. A nation may enter a maximum of three athletes per event. For this event a total of 36 athletes representing 19 nations qualified to compete.

Results
The results are:

Heats
 Q – qualified for Quarterfinals
 ADV – advanced
 PEN – penalty

Semifinals
 QA – qualified for Finals A
 QB – qualified for Finals B
 ADV – advanced
 PEN – penalty

Finals

Final B (classification round)

Final A (medal round)

Final standings
The final overall standings were:

References

Women's short track speed skating at the 2014 Winter Olympics